Prince Gaetano Starrabba di Giardinelli (born December 3, 1932, in Palermo, Sicily) is a former Italian racing driver.  He participated in one Formula One World Championship Grand Prix, racing a Lotus-Maserati at the 1961 Italian Grand Prix on September 10, 1961.  He scored no championship points. He also competed in several non-Championship Formula One races.

The title Prince di Giardelli was his as a member of the Italian nobility.

Complete Formula One World Championship results 
(key)

References

Profile at grandprix.com

Italian racing drivers
Italian Formula One drivers
1932 births
Living people